Taoism in Vietnam is believed to have been introduced into the country during the first Chinese domination of Vietnam. Under Lý dynasty Emperor Lý Nhân Tông (1072-1127), the examination for the recruitment of officials consisted of essays on the "three doctrines - Tam Giáo/三教” (Confucianism, Buddhism, and Taoism).

Taoism in its pure form is rarely practiced in Vietnam, but elements of it have been absorbed into the Vietnamese folk religion and fragments of it are still practiced in areas with small Chinese communities.  One of these small communities is Khanh Van Nam Vien Pagoda  which is a temple owned by Cantonese Quanzhen Taoists in Saigon. Fujianese Taoists also inhabit smaller rural villages in the west such as  Châu Đốc where the local spirit medium rituals belong to the Lu Shan Sect. Other than these small Chinese communities, most other descendants of the Taoist religion in Vietnam are not as organized as they would be in places with larger Chinese communities therefore have been turned into nothing more than shamans also known as thầy pháp. Thầy pháp are said to specialize in different types of sorcery. Depending on who and what regions of Vietnam, the shaman may be more Taoist based or may also have Cambodian, Thai, or Vietnamese folk magic influences especially near the borders of the Mekong Delta where it is close to Cambodia. However, a handful of Vietnamese have traveled on pilgrimages to Taoist monasteries in China and have been bringing it back to Vietnam. These monasteries mainly being the QuanZhen and Zheng Yi sects are different then the folk Taoist traditions in Vietnam. 

Taoism has also influenced the Caodaist and Dao Mau religions in Vietnam.

According to Professor Liam Kelley during the Tang dynasty native spirits were subsumed into Daoism and the Daoist view of these spirits completely replaced the original native tales. Buddhism and Daoist replaced native narratives surrounding Mount Yên Tử (安子山).

See also
Chinese ancestral worship
Chinese folk religion in Southeast Asia
Chinese ritual mastery traditions
Quán Thánh Temple
Religion in Vietnam
Temple of the Jade Mountain
Thành hoàng
Three teachings

References

 Tu Anh T. Vu. Worshiping the Mother Goddess: The Dao Mau Movement in Northern Vietnam. In: Explorations in Southeast Asian Studies, vol. 6, no. 1, Spring 2006.

External link